Madhukar Shamshere Jung Bahadur Rana (19 July 1941 – 16 October 2019) was a Nepalese development economist, who served as Minister of Finance of Nepal in 2005, and was Professor of economics at the South Asian Institute of Management in Nepal. He was a member of the Rana dynasty of Nepal.

He was the founder of the first finance company in Nepal called Nepal Finance Company Ltd. (NEFINSCO). 

When he was the General Manager of the government owned National Trading Limited in the early '70s, he left the company with a USD 5 million profit on its books, the only GM of National Trading to ever do so.

References

Further reading 
 

1941 births
2019 deaths
Finance ministers of Nepal
Nepalese economists
Rana dynasty